This is a historical list of countries by firearm-related death rate per 100,000 population in the listed year.

Homicide figures may include justifiable homicides along with criminal homicides, depending upon jurisdiction and reporting standards. Not included are homicides, suicides, accidental deaths, or justifiable deaths by any means other than by firearm.

Based upon various metrics alongside calculations over the course of multiple years, Singapore has the lowest firearm-related death rate in the world, and Venezuela has the highest.

List
This is a table which is giving information about "firearm-related death rate per 100,000 population per year".

Unintentional: Unintentional shooting deaths.
Undetermined: Shooting deaths in which the cause remains undecided.

Charts and graphs

See also
 Firearm death rates in the United States by state
 List of countries by intentional homicide rate
 List of countries by suicide rate
 List of cities by murder rate
 List of U.S. states and territories by violent crime rate
 List of U.S. states and territories by intentional homicide rate
 List of United States cities by crime rate (2012) (250,000+)
 Percent of households with guns by country
 United States cities by crime rate (100,000–250,000)
 United States cities by crime rate (60,000-100,000)
 Index of gun politics articles
 Estimated number of civilian guns per capita by country

References

External links
 Systematic comparison of 195 countries and territories for the period from 1990 to 2016:   
 

Historic data can be found on the United Nations Survey on Crime Trends and the Operations of Criminal Justice Systems (UN-CTS) page.

 Centers for Disease Control (CDC) Fast Facts - Suicide and Self Injury, Injuries, and Homicide

 —Causes of death by year from countries that have reported to the WHO. Firearm deaths correspond to ICD-10 codes W32-W34, Accidental discharge of firearm; X72-X74, Intentional self-harm by firearm; X93-X95, Assault by firearm; Y22-Y24, Firearm discharge, undetermined intent.
 —Contains statistics from 36 countries between 1990 and 1995.

Firearms
Countries
Countries
Firearm-related death rate
Firearm-related death rate